The Old Bell Telephone Building is a historic commercial building at 109 North Ash Street in downtown Osceola, Arkansas.  It is a two-story flat-roof brick building, built in 1911 to house the town's telephone exchange.  The building is three bays wide, with the door in the right bay, with a transom window above.  There is an original brass slot for accepting payments between the doorway and the center window.  The building was built by R. C. Rose, a local attorney who owned the telephone exchange.

The building was listed on the National Register of Historic Places in 1987.

See also
National Register of Historic Places listings in Mississippi County, Arkansas

References

Office buildings on the National Register of Historic Places in Arkansas
Commercial buildings completed in 1911
Osceola, Arkansas
National Register of Historic Places in Mississippi County, Arkansas
Individually listed contributing properties to historic districts on the National Register in Arkansas
Bell System
1911 establishments in Arkansas